"Commotion" is a song by Creedence Clearwater Revival from the album Green River, and was also the B-side of the single release of the album's title track. In 1980, "Tombstone Shadow" b/w "Commotion'" was released as a single in the United States. While released as a B-side, "Commotion" reached #30 in the United States on the Billboard Hot 100 and #16 in Germany. It was written by John Fogerty and recorded at Wally Heider's Studios in San Francisco in June 1969. The 45rpm was the debut session of the band at Wally Heider's and the first collaboration with engineer Russ Gary.

Lyrics and music
"Commotion" is a chaotic song, which depicts the manic side of life in New York. 40 years later, John Fogerty put the lyrics about traffic in the city, freeways, hurrying and rushing to broader context: "I was writing about what was in the air, and that was what came out of me. I was just doing what came naturally."  Los Angeles Times critic Robert Hilburn found the lines "Traffic in the city turns my head around/No, no, no, no, no/Backed up on the freeway, backed up in the church/And everywhere you look there's a frown" to exhibit "timely observation" and "contemporary social comment."  Fogerty also recalls borrowing the beat of the song from a train. Fogerty has also stated that the song is a reaction to blaring televisions and other noise of modern civilization, reflecting his preference for peace and clarity.  Tampa Tribune critic Rory O'Connor referred to it as a "complaint about the hustle and hassle of the world."

Fogerty biographer Thomas Kitts describes "Commotion" as representing a "noisy, restless" world, "full of chaos and damage."  According to Kitts, the singer sees "confusion, reckless energy, random movement and unhappiness" everywhere, and no one, including politicians or the church, can provide "leadership or direction."  Kitts sees a similarity between the lyrics of this song and a hair spray can turned into a missile in Thomas Pynchon's The Crying of Lot 49, as both reflect commotion that may be interpreted as a trope for an upcoming apocalypse.

Kitts praised the strong foundation provided by the rhythm section of drummer Doug Clifford and bassist Stu Cook, stating that John Fogerty uses that foundation well "for a series of [guitar] riffs and solos that punctuated vocal lines and increased drama and tension.

Fogerty said of the song in 1970:

"Ramble Tamble," released on Creedence Clearwater Revival's 1970 album Cosmo's Factory, developed from parts of the working version of  "Commotion."

Reception
Billboard described "Commotion" as a "hard rock item with a strong lyric line."  Cash Box described it as having "the kick of an early rock outing mindful of...'Suzie Q.'"  The single reached the Top 40, peaking at #30 on the Billboard Hot 100.

Live performance
The band played the song regularly until their last public show in May 1972. The concert at Oakland Coliseum on January 31, 1970, was released as a live album ten years later. A live recording of "Commotion" appears also on Live in Europe compilation. John Fogerty played "Commotion" for the first time during his solo career on the opening leg of the Long Road Home Tour at Palais des Congrès, Paris, France, on June 28, 2006. The song survived as a regular number in his set-list until summer 2007 after which the plays became rarer.

In TV series
"Commotion" appears in TV series Parenthood, episode Everything Is Not Okay (2012).

References

1969 songs
Creedence Clearwater Revival songs
Songs written by John Fogerty
Song recordings produced by John Fogerty